Jonathan Lazar is a professor in the College of Information Studies at the University of Maryland, where he is Associate Director of the Trace Center, the nation's oldest research center on technology and disability, and is a core faculty member in the Human-Computer Interaction Lab (HCIL). He recently moved from being a professor at Towson University. He researches Human-Computer-Interaction, web accessibility for people with disabilities, user-centered design, and law and public policy related to HCI and accessibility. He is well-known for his work on accessibility  for people who are blind.

Education 
He earned his LLM from the University of Pennsylvania Law School, his MS and PhD from University of Maryland Graduate School Baltimore (UMBC)  and his BBA from Loyola University Maryland.
He completed a Fellowship at the Radcliffe Institute for Advanced Study at Harvard University.

Career 
He started his career as an assistant professor at Towson University, where he served as director of the Information Systems program and founded the Universal Usability Laboratory. He was promoted to the rank of Associate Professor and in 2009, the rank of Professor. In 2019, he joined the faculty of the University of Maryland at the Full Professor rank. He has also been an associate researcher at the Harvard Law School Project on Disability since 2013.  

He is the author, co-author, or editor of 13 books, including the well-cited Research Methods in Human-Computer Interaction (2nd edition), Universal Usability: Designing Computer Interfaces for Diverse User Populations and Ensuring Digital Accessibility through Process and Policy.

Awards 
 In 2010, he was awarded with Dr. Jacob Bolotin Award by National Federation of the Blind.
 In 2016, he won the SIGCHI Social Impact Award by the Special Interest Group on Computer–Human Interaction
 In 2019, he won the Inaugural Rachel Olivero Accessibility Innovation Award

References 

Living people
University System of Maryland faculty
Loyola University Maryland alumni
University System of Maryland alumni
Year of birth missing (living people)
Human–computer interaction researchers
American disability rights activists
Web accessibility
Usability